Ankave or Angave is a Papuan language spoken by the approximately 1,600 Angave people in Kerema District, Gulf Province, Papua New Guinea.

Phonology

Vowels

Diphthongs:

Consonants

Writing system
An orthography using the Latin script has been developed for Angave, but less than 5% of its speakers are literate.

Notes

Further reading
Speece, Richard F. 1988. Phonological processes affecting segments in Angave. Language and Linguistics in Melanesia 17(1/2): 1–139.

External links

Ankave dictionary
English-Angave dictionary/SIL

Languages of Gulf Province
Angan languages